The 1907 Latrobe Athletic Association season was their twelfth and final season in existence. The decrease in community interest and the change of the team from the professional ranks to a local amateur status in 1907, coincided with John Brallier's last year as a player, all led to the team folding. The team finished 5-2-2 in 1907.

Schedule

Game notes

References

Latrobe Athletic Association
Latrobe Athletic Association seasons